Statistics of Swiss Super League in the 1953–54 season.

Overview
It was contested by 14 teams, and FC La Chaux-de-Fonds won the championship.

League standings

Results

Sources
 Switzerland 1953–54 at RSSSF

Swiss Football League seasons
Swiss
1953–54 in Swiss football